Edward Parry may refer to:

 Edward Parry (Archbishop of the West Indies) (1861–1943), Bishop of Guyana
 Edward Parry (Bishop of Killaloe) (c. 1599–1650), Bishop of Killaloe
 Edward Parry (Bishop of Dover) (1830–1890), Bishop of Dover
 Edward Parry (prelate) (1862–1922), Roman Catholic prelate, Apostolic Prefect of Zambesi (1920–1922)
 Edward Parry (Royal Navy officer) (1893–1972), Royal Navy admiral
 Edward Abbott Parry (1863–1943), English judge and dramatist
 Edward Hagarty Parry (1855–1931), Canadian-born English international footballer
 Sir Edward Parry (1790–1855), English rear-admiral and Arctic explorer
 Ted Parry (fl. 1892–1925), Welsh footballer